I Stand in the Dark Midnight is a 1927 German silent film directed by Max Mack and starring Grete Reinwald, Gerd Briese, and Helene von Bolváry.

The film's sets were designed by the art director Kurt Richter.

Cast
Grete Reinwald as Liesl
Gerd Briese as Rudloff
Georg Burghardt as Pastor
Hugo Fischer-Köppe as Junge
Gisela Günther as Bertha
Karl Harbacher as Gottfried Heidepriem
Paul Morgan as Meier
Leo Peukert as Holst
Ernst Pröckl as Franz
Gustav Püttjer
Ernst Rückert as Willi
Helene von Bolváry as Stine
Luise Werckmeister as Pfarrerin

References

External links

Films of the Weimar Republic
Films directed by Max Mack
German silent feature films
German black-and-white films